René Legacy is a Canadian Liberal politician who has represented Bathurst West-Beresford in the Legislative Assembly of New Brunswick since 2020.

Political career 
Legacy was selected to succeed Brian Kenny as the Liberal candidate in Bathurst West-Beresford. He was elected in the 2020 general election.

References 

Living people
New Brunswick Liberal Association MLAs
21st-century Canadian politicians
People from Bathurst, New Brunswick
Year of birth missing (living people)